The men's discus throw event at the 2015 Summer Universiade was held on 11 July at the Gwangju Universiade Main Stadium.

Results

References

Discus
2015